Jack Goldberg was a vaudeville performer who became a producer of films  for African American audiences. He ran Hollwood Pictures Corporation in New York City and produced at least 2-dozen films. His brother Bert Goldberg ran Harlemwood Pictures in Dallas, Texas. Goldberg was white. He married Mamie Smith.

He was a supervising producer of the 1932 film Harlem is Heaven. He produced the 1939 film Paradise in Harlem starring Mamie Smith, his wife. He founded Herald Pictures in 1946.

A New York Times reviewer characterized his 1944 film We've Come a Long, Long Way as a rambling testimonial.

Filmography
Harlem is Heaven (1932), supervising producer
Gig and Saddle (also known as Scandal of 1933) (1933)
Paradise in Harlem (1939)Sunday Sinners (1940)We've Come a Long, Long Way (1944)Boy! What A Girl! (1947), the first of 11 Herald Pictures filmsMiracle in Harlem'' (1948)

References

Vaudeville performers

Year of birth missing (living people)
Living people